The artificial objects leaving the Solar System are all space probes and the upper stages of their launch vehicles, all launched by NASA. Three of the probes, Voyager 1, Voyager 2, and New Horizons are still functioning and are regularly contacted by radio communication, while Pioneer 10 and Pioneer 11 are now derelict. In addition to these spacecraft, some upper stages and de-spin weights are leaving the Solar System, assuming they continue on their trajectories.

These objects are leaving the Solar System because their velocity and direction are taking them away from the Sun, and at their distance from the Sun, its gravitational pull is not sufficient to pull these objects back or into orbit. They are not impervious to the gravitational pull of the Sun and are being slowed, but are still traveling in excess of escape velocity to leave the Solar System and coast into interstellar space.

Planetary exploration probes
Pioneer 10 – launched in 1972, flew past Jupiter in 1973 and is heading in the direction of Aldebaran (65 light years away) in the constellation of Taurus. Contact was lost in January 2003, and it is estimated to have passed 132 astronomical units (AU; one AU is roughly the average distance between Earth and the Sun: 150 million kilometers (93 million miles)).
Pioneer 11 – launched in 1973, flew past Jupiter in 1974 and Saturn in 1979. Contact was lost in November 1995, and it is estimated to be at around 107 AU.  The spacecraft is headed toward the constellation of Aquila, northwest of the constellation of Sagittarius. Barring an  incident, Pioneer 11 will pass near one of the stars in the constellation in about 4 million years.
Voyager 2 – launched in August 1977, flew past Jupiter in 1979, Saturn in 1981, Uranus in 1986, and Neptune in 1989. The probe left the heliosphere for interstellar space at 119 AU on 5 November 2018. Voyager 2 is still active. It is not headed toward any particular star, although in roughly 40,000 years it should pass 1.7 light-years from the star Ross 248. If undisturbed for 296,000 years, it should pass by the star Sirius at a distance of 4.3 light-years.
Voyager 1 – launched in September 1977, flew past Jupiter in 1979 and Saturn in 1980, making a special close approach to Saturn's moon Titan. The probe passed the heliopause at 121 AU on 25 August 2012 to enter interstellar space. Voyager 1 is still active. It is headed towards an encounter with star Gliese 445 (AC +79 3888), which lies 17.6 light-years from Earth, in about 40,000 years.
New Horizons – launched in 2006, the probe flew past Jupiter in 2007 and Pluto on 14 July 2015. It flew past the Kuiper belt object 486958 Arrokoth on January 1, 2019, as part of the Kuiper Belt Extended Mission (KEM).

Although other probes were launched first, Voyager 1 has achieved a higher speed and overtaken all others. Voyager 1 overtook Voyager 2 a few months after launch, on 19 December 1977. It overtook Pioneer 11 in 1983, and then Pioneer 10—becoming the probe farthest from Earth—on February 17, 1998. Voyager 2 is moving faster than all other probes launched before it; it overtook Pioneer 11 in the late 1980s and will overtake Pioneer 10 in 2023.

Depending on how the "Pioneer anomaly" affects it, New Horizons will also probably pass the Pioneer probes, but will need many years to do so. It will not overtake Pioneer 11 until the 22nd century, will not overtake Pioneer 10 until the end of that century, and will never overtake the Voyagers.

Speed and distance from the Sun 
To put the distances in the table in context, Pluto's average distance (semi-major axis) is about 40 AU.

Note: Data above as of February 24, 2023. Source: JPL, heavens-above.com, and for New Horizons.

Solar escape velocity is a function of distance (r) from the Sun's center, given by

where the product G Msun is the heliocentric gravitational parameter.

In order to leave the Solar System, the probe needs to reach the local escape velocity. After leaving Earth, the Sun's escape velocity is 42.1 km/s. In order to reach this speed, it is highly advantageous to also use the orbital speed of the Earth around the Sun, which is 29.78 km/s. By later passing near a planet, a probe can gain extra speed with a gravity assist.

Propulsion stages

Every planetary probe was placed into its escape trajectory by a multistage rocket, the last stage of which ends up on nearly the same trajectory as the probe it launched. Because these stages cannot be actively guided, their trajectories are now different from the probes they launched (the probes were guided with small thrusters that allow course changes). However, in cases where the spacecraft acquired escape velocity because of a gravity assist, the stages may not have a similar course and there is the extremely remote possibility that they collided with something. The stages on an escape trajectory are:
 Pioneer 10 third stage, a TE364-4 variant of the Star-37 solid fuel rocket.
 Voyager 1 fourth stage, a Star 37E solid fuel rocket.
 Voyager 2 fourth stage, a Star 37E solid fuel rocket.
 New Horizons third stage, a Star 48B solid fuel rocket, is on a similar escape trajectory out of the Solar System to New Horizons, even arriving at Jupiter six hours before New Horizons. On October 15, 2015 it passed Pluto's orbit at a distance of 213 million kilometers (over 1 AU) distant from Pluto. This was four months after New Horizons Pluto flyby.

In addition, two small yo-yo de-spin weights on wires were used to reduce the spin of the New Horizons probe prior to its release from the third-stage rocket. Once the spin rate was lowered, these masses and the wires were released, and so are also on an escape trajectory out of the Solar System.

None of the above objects are trackable – they have no power or radio antennas, spin uncontrollably, and are too small to be detected. Their exact positions are unknowable beyond their projected Solar System escape trajectories.

The third stage of Pioneer 11 is thought to be in solar orbit because its encounter with Jupiter would not have resulted in escape from the Solar System. Pioneer 11 gained the required velocity to escape the Solar System in its subsequent encounter with Saturn.

New Horizons passed the Moon's orbit in just nine hours. The subsequent encounter with Jupiter only increased its velocity, and just enabled the probe to arrive at Pluto three years earlier than without this encounter.

Thus the only objects to date to be launched directly into a solar escape trajectory were the New Horizons spacecraft, its third stage, and the two de-spin masses. The New Horizons Centaur (second) stage is not escaping; it is in a 2.83-year heliocentric (solar) orbit.

The Pioneer 10 and 11, and Voyager 1 and 2 Centaur (second) stages are also in heliocentric orbits.https://usspaceobjectsregistry.state.gov/Lists/SpaceObjects/DispFormaspx?ID=3348.html

 Future 

Given the huge emptiness of interstellar space, all the objects listed here are likely to continue into deep space in timelines that, barring the exceptionally unlikely chance of their colliding with (or being collected by) another object, could outlast even the Main Sequence existence of the Sun's life, billions of years hence. One estimated timescale as to the likelihood of the Pioneer or Voyager spacecraft colliding with a star (or stellar remnant) is 1020 (100 quintillion) years. They are very unlikely however to gain enough velocity to escape the Milky Way galaxy (or its future merger with the Andromeda galaxy) into intergalactic space.

Ulysses

In 1990, Ulysses''' was launched and was designed to study the Sun; its extended mission ended in 2008. Ulysses is currently in a 79° inclination orbit around the Sun with its apoapsis crossing the orbit of Jupiter. In November 2098, it will have another close fly-by with Jupiter, crossing between the orbits of Europa and Ganymede. After this slingshot maneuver, it will possibly enter a hyperbolic trajectory around the Sun and eventually leave the Solar System.Ulysses'' is now switched-off as its RTG power supply has run down, and so is uncontactable and cannot be tracked or guided in any way. Its exact trajectory is therefore unknowable as factors such as solar radiation pressure could significantly alter its encounter path.

Gallery

See also
 Interstellar probe
 Intergalactic travel
 List of artificial objects in heliocentric orbit
 List of artificial objects on extraterrestrial surfaces
 Deliberate crash landings on extraterrestrial bodies
 Oberth effect

References

External links 
Spacecraft escaping the Solar System in heavens-above.com
NASA = Explaining planetary gravity assists
Future stellar flybys of the Voyager and Pioneer spacecraft determined using Gaia Data Release 2

Artificial leaving
 
Leaving solar system